Taito Legends is a compilation of 29 arcade games released for the PlayStation 2, Xbox, and Microsoft Windows. The games were originally developed by Taito. The European release was published by Empire Interactive, who had licensed the games from Taito and developed the compilation. Although they did not get official credit for it in the American versions, Sega published the North American and South American releases.

Extra features include interviews with some of the game designers, original sales flyers, and arcade cabinet art.

Two follow-up compilations were issued; Taito Legends 2 for the PlayStation 2, Xbox and PC and the PlayStation Portable exclusive Taito Legends Power-Up.

Games
While the Western Taito Legends consists of 29 arcade games, the Japanese Taito Memories includes only 25 arcade games per volume, omitting Jungle Hunt, Colony 7, The Electric Yo-Yo, Zoo Keeper and Tube It.

Between 2005 and 2007, in total four similar compilations had been released by Taito for the PlayStation 2 in its home market of Japan:
 
 
 
 

The games on this compilation are emulations of their respective arcade originals; however, the software lacks light gun support for Operation Wolf, Operation Thunderbolt, and Space Gun. These games place a gun cursor on the screen, which the player can move around with the analog stick (console versions), or mouse (PC version).

The games that had to be altered due to licensing issues are Jungle Hunt and Rainbow Islands. Elements of Jungle Hunt had to be altered such as the design of the Tarzanesque character and the signature Tarzan yell due to licensing issues with Edgar Rice Burroughs estate. Rainbow Islands had to alter its music for the re-release due to licensing.

Reception 

Taito Legends received slightly positive reviews with a score of 74.06% for the Xbox version, 71.68% for the PlayStation 2 version, and 75.17% for the Windows version on GameRankings. IGN praised the collection for a superb presentation, as well as the large amount of bonus material, but criticized some titles in the collection as "worthless filler". Other criticisms are the lack of online leaderboards, the omission of Arkanoid and Chase H.Q., the lack of light gun support for Operation Wolf, Operation Thunderbolt, and Space Gun, the lack of control configuration, and for the controls being "flipped", making it potentially uncomfortable and unnatural to many, less-adaptable players. Only the Windows version fixes the error regarding the collection's control scheme.

References

External links 
Xplosiv pages: PS2, 
Empire support pages: PC (xplosiv red), PC xplosiv, PS2 Xplosiv, Xbox Empire
XPLOSIV UNVEILS TAITO LEGENDS LINE-UP
Empire Interactive announces the much-anticipated Taito Legends

2005 video games
Square Enix video game compilations
Video games developed in the United Kingdom
PlayStation 2 games
Square Enix franchises
Taito games
Taito video game compilations
Sega video games
Windows games
Xbox games
Empire Interactive games
Video games developed in Japan